Horasis is an independent, international think tank, headquartered in Zurich, Switzerland. Founded in 2005, by Frank-Jürgen Richter, former director of the World Economic Forum, Horasis is dedicated to the innovation and development of sustainable emerging markets. The annual Horasis Global Meeting in Cascais, Portugal, is a gathering of business people with government officials, scientists and intellectuals centered on issues concerning corporations and societies.

Activities

Horasis provides a platform for cooperation and knowledge-sharing, particularly between developed countries and emerging markets. The community works principally through partnerships with corporations, governments and international organizations, often serving as an incubator for new initiatives. These meetings rotate amongst host countries which stage the events; selected corporations supplement speeches and presentations about actual topics.

Horasis meetings are usually held in a host country outside the   geographic location of the 'in-focus' nation. The events are a means for the countries 'in focus' as guests (China, India, and South East Asia) to promote relations with the world and to display soft power through co-option and cooperation. The meetings are also a platform for the  host country to engage in  policy dialogue with the guest countries.

Publications
Horasis publishes reports based on the meetings, contributes op-eds to the international press and expert opinions for TV news programs.

Business Leaders of the Year
Horasis awards the "Business Leaders of the Year" award for entrepreneurs who have been building and leading successful global firms. The award was first given in 2006.  The award ceremonies take place at the regional meetings.

Global meeting 
The annual Horasis Global Meeting is a gathering of business people with government officials, scientists and intellectuals. Around 500 participants from 70 countries gather every year to discuss issues concerning corporations and societies. Issues such as economic growth, innovation, migration and inequality usually figure in the debates.

The Global Meeting was first held in Liverpool in 2016, and since 2017 is held annually in Cascais, Portugal.

Regional meetings
Horasis holds the Horasis China Meeting, the Horasis India Meeting and the Horasis Asia Meeting on an annual basis. In 2017, the Horasis China Meeting was for the first time held in Sheffield, UK, and was attended by more than 300 Chinese business people, including representatives from state-owned companies, investment funds and private firms, as well as their British counterparts. The international Horasis India Meeting is attended by hundreds of business people and politicians from India and around the world. The Horasis Asia Meeting in 2017 was co-hosted by the Government of West Bengal and the Indian Chamber of Commerce (ICC). The Horasis Asia Meeting in 2018 and 2019 were both held in Binh Duong New City in Bình Dương Province, Vietnam.

References

External links

 

Think tanks based in Switzerland
International economic organizations
Annual events in Switzerland
Global economic conferences
Organisations based in Zürich
International organisations based in Switzerland